Shontelle Woodman (born 2 September 1986) is a New Zealand rugby league footballer who played as a  for the New Zealand Warriors in the NRL Women's Premiership.

Playing career
In 2011, while playing for Papakura, Woodman was named the Auckland Rugby League Player of the Year.

In 2014, Woodman made her Test debut for New Zealand, playing alongside her twin sister Sharnita, in a 12–8 win over Australia.

She scored three tries in the tournament.

On 31 July 2018, Woodman was named in the New Zealand Warriors NRL Women's Premiership squad. In Round 1 of the 2018 NRL Women's season, she made her debut for the Warriors in a 10–4 win over the Sydney Roosters.

References

External links
Richmond Rovers profile

1986 births
Living people
New Zealand female rugby league players
New Zealand women's national rugby league team players
Rugby league centres
Rugby league wingers
New Zealand Warriors (NRLW) players